Duane Douglas Allen (October 21, 1937 – May 7, 2003) was a professional American football tight end in the National Football League (NFL). He was the Santa Ana College's Athlete of the Year and the Eastern Conference Lineman of the Year. He was drafted in 1961 by the Los Angeles Rams in the ninth round of the NFL draft. He spent seven years in the NFL playing for the Los Angeles Rams (1961–64), Baltimore Colts (1965-66) and Chicago Bears (1967).. He appeared in the 1975 Richard Fleischer movie, Mandingo as «Topaze». He was born in Alhambra, California in 1937. He died at Huntington Memorial Hospital in Pasadena after having suffered a stroke on April 11, 2003.

References

External links

NFL.com profile

1937 births
2003 deaths
Sportspeople from Alhambra, California
Players of American football from California
American football tight ends
Los Angeles Rams players
Pittsburgh Steelers players
Chicago Bears players
Burials at Forest Lawn Memorial Park (Glendale)
Santa Ana Dons football players